The , also known as the Second Battle of Hakata Bay, was the second attempt by the Mongol-led Yuan dynasty of China to invade Japan after their failed attempt seven years earlier at the Battle of Bun'ei. In the summer of 1281, the Yuan invaded with two large armies. The Japanese defenders were aided by a major storm which sank a sizeable portion of the Yuan fleets. The invaders who reached the shore were repulsed shortly after landing. The Japanese called the opportune storm kamikaze, a name later used in the Second World War for pilots who carried out aerial suicide attacks.

Background
After the failed first invasion by the Yuan navy, the Japanese made many defense preparations, constructing numerous fortifications along the coast. Armies were kept in a state of readiness to repel a further attack.

In early 1280 Kublai Khan planned another invasion of Japan and ordered his shipbuilders to rebuild the whole fleet within a year. In the short time available many of the ships were poorly made; many were flat-bottomed river boats requisitioned by the Emperor.

Battle
By June 1281, 900 Yuan ships were gathered in Korea; the force was called the Eastern Route Army. They were crewed by 17,000 sailors, and transported 10,000 Korean soldiers and 15,000 Mongols and Chinese. The Southern Route Army, meanwhile, was assembled just south of the Yangtze River, in China. It is said to have consisted of 100,000 men on 3,500 ships. As before, Iki and Tsushima islands fell quickly to the much larger Yuan forces.

The Eastern Route Army arrived at Hakata Bay on June 23, and decided to proceed with the invasion without waiting for the larger Southern force which had still not left China. They were a short distance to the north and east of where their force had landed in 1274, and were in fact beyond the walls and defenses constructed by the Japanese. The samurai responded quickly, assaulting the invaders with waves of defenders, denying them the beachhead.

At night small boats carried small bands of samurai into the Yuan fleet in the bay. Under cover of darkness they boarded enemy ships, killed as many as they could, and withdrew before dawn. This harassing tactic led the Yuan forces to retreat to Tsushima, where they would wait for the Southern Route Army. However, over the course of the next several weeks, 3,000 men were killed in close quarters combat in the hot weather. Yuan forces never gained a beachhead.

The first of the Southern force ships arrived on July 16, and by August 12 the two fleets were ready to attack Japan. On August 15 a major tempest struck the Tsushima Straits, lasting two full days and destroying most of the Yuan fleet. Contemporary Japanese accounts indicate that over 4,000 ships were destroyed in the storm; 80% of the Yuan soldiers either drowned or were killed by samurai on the beaches. The loss of ships was so great that "a person could walk across from one point of land to another on a mass of wreckage".

Main battles of the Kōan Campaign

Battle of Tsushima Island – Japanese victory 
On June 8, the Mongolian Army landed on Tsushima island and invaded. They met fierce resistance there and later withdrew.

Battle of Shika Island – Japanese victory 

On June 23, the Mongolians attempted a landing on Shika Island, but were unable to make significant advances. By June 24, Mongolian forces had control of most of the island, but on the morning of June 25, the Japanese army divided their force into two and attacked along Umi no Nakamichi. The Japanese army lost 300 soldiers but defeated Hong Dagu, who nearly died in this battle, and Zhang Cheng.

On June 26, Zhang Cheng solidified the defense of his army but the Mongolian army was again defeated by the fierce Japanese attacks.  After this defeat the Mongolian army escaped to Iki Island.

Battle of Iki Island – Japanese victory 
On July 16, a Japanese army of approximately 10,000, led by the Matsura clan, Ryūzōji clan and Takagi clan began an all-out attack on Iki Island. On July 18, Ryūzōji Iekiyo (龍造寺家清) landed on Setoura beach and defeated the Mongolian army. As a result, the Mongolian army abandoned Iki Island and withdrew to Hirado Island.

Battle of Mikuriya – annihilation of Mongol navy 

On August 20, Takezaki Suenaga attacked and annihilated the Mongolian Navy. After this battle, most of the commanders of the Mongolian army escaped to their own country.

Battle of Taka Island – annihilation of Mongol army 

On August 22, there were about 100,000 soldiers of the Mongol army without commanders. Upon realizing this situation, the Japanese army launched an attack. Togō Korechika (都甲惟親), Togō Koretō (都甲惟遠), Fujiwara no Sukekado (藤原資門) and Shimazu Nagahisa (島津長久) annihilated the remaining Mongolian army and took 20,000 to 30,000 prisoners in this battle. At the completion of this battle, Japan's victory was confirmed.

Aftermath
Kublai Khan began to gather forces to prepare for a third invasion attempt, but was soon distracted by events in Southeast and Central Asia, and no third attempt was ever made.

See also
Battle of Bun'ei - the first invasion attempt by Kublai Khan, in 1274.
Mongol invasions of Japan

Notes

References

 Davis, Paul K. (1999).  100 Decisive Battles: From Ancient Times to the Present. Oxford: Oxford University Press. ; 
 Titsingh, Isaac. (1834). Nihon Odai Ichiran; ou,  Annales des empereurs du Japon.  Paris: Royal Asiatic Society, Oriental Translation Fund of Great Britain and Ireland. OCLC 5850691
 Turnbull, Stephen R. (2003).  Genghis Khan and the Mongol Conquests, 1190-1400. London: Taylor & Francis. 

1280s in Japan
1281 in Asia
Koan 1281
Koan 1281
Koan 1281
Wars involving Imperial China
Koan
13th century in Korea
1281 in the Mongol Empire